Marquess of Moratalla is a hereditary title in the Peerage of Spain, granted in 1681 by Charles II to Francisco Luis Fernández de Córdoba, Lord of Belmonte and Moratalla.

The name refers to the Palace of Moratalla in Hornachuelos, Córdoba.

Marquesses of Moratalla (1681)

Francisco Luis Fernández de Córdoba y de la Cerda, 1st Marquess of Moratalla
José Garcés Fernández de Córdoba y Carrillo de Mendoza, 2nd Marquess of Moratalla
María Belén Fernández de Córdoba y Lante della Rovere, 3rd Marchioness of Moratalla

Marquesses of Moratalla (1962)

Ángel Cabeza de Vaca y Carvajal, 4th Marquess of Moratalla
María de la Soledad Cabeza de Vaca y Leighton, 5th Marchioness of Moratalla
Isidro Forester Labrouche y Cabeza de Vaca, 6th Marquess of Moratalla

See also
Marquess of Portago
Count of la Mejorada

References

Bibliography
 

Marquesses of Spain
Lists of Spanish nobility
Noble titles created in 1681